Moss Beach is a coastal census-designated place in San Mateo County, California, with a year 2020 census population of 3,214. Located in Moss Beach are the Fitzgerald Marine Reserve, a marine sanctuary; the Half Moon Bay Airport, the historic Moss Beach Distillery; and the Seal Cove Inn, a destination lodging property. Moss Beach is a cool coastal microclimate that gives one a sense of separation from the nearby metropolitan San Francisco Bay Area and assures that summer temperatures are generally mild.

History
Moss Beach began as a resort destination, with its first hotel built in 1881 by Juergen Wienke.  It grew with the advent of the Ocean Shore Railroad.

Geography

Nearby towns include Montara to the north, El Granada, Princeton-by-the-Sea, and Half Moon Bay to the south.

Demographics

2010
The 2010 United States Census reported that Moss Beach had a population of 3,103. The racial make-up of Moss Beach was 2,280 (73.5%) White, 25 (0.8%) African American, 43 (1.4%) Native American, 118 (3.8%) Asian, 9 (0.3%) Pacific Islander, 494 (15.9%) from other races, and 134 (4.3%) from two or more races. Hispanic or Latino of any race were 903 persons (29.1%).

The census reported that 2,983 people (96.1% of the population) lived in households, 12 (0.4%) lived in non-institutionalized group quarters, and 108 (3.5%) were institutionalized.

There were 1,062 households, of which 359 (33.8%) had children under the age of 18 living in them, 607 (57.2%) were opposite-sex married couples living together, 85 (8.0%) had a female householder with no husband present, 41 (3.9%) had a male householder with no wife present. There were 49 (4.6%) unmarried opposite-sex partnerships, and 14 (1.3%) same-sex married couples or partnerships.251 households (23.6%) were made up of individuals, and 68 (6.4%) had someone living alone who was 65 years of age or older. The average household size was 2.81. There were 733 families (69.0% of all households); the average family size was 3.35.

710 people (22.9%) were under the age of 18, 234 people (7.5%) aged 18 to 24, 699 people (22.5%) aged 25 to 44, 1,097 people (35.4%) aged 45 to 64, and 363 people (11.7%) were 65 years of age or older. The median age was 43.2 years. For every 100 females, there were 99.9 males.  For every 100 females age 18 and over, there were 97.6 males.

The homeowner vacancy rate was 1.2%; the rental vacancy rate was 6.3%.  2,448 people (78.9% of the population) lived in owner-occupied housing units and 535 people (17.2%) lived in rental housing units.

2000
At the 2000 census, there were 1953 people, 740 households and 526 families residing in the Census Designated Place (CDP). The racial make-up in 2010 was 62.9% non-Hispanic White, 0.7% non-Hispanic African American, 0.2% Native American, 3.8% Asian, 0.3% Pacific Islander, 0.3% from other races, and 2.6% from two or more races.  29.1% of the population were Hispanic.

There were 740 households, of which 36.1% had children under the age of 18, 58.9% were married couples, 7.4% had a female householder with no husband present, and 28.9% were non-families. 18.4% of all households were made up of individuals, and 2.6% had someone living alone who was 65 years of age or older.  The average household size was 2.64 and average family size was 2.98.

The median household income was $91,992 and the median family income was $99,307. Males had a median income of $81,619 and females $41,411. The per capita income was $41,283. 4.3% of the population and 3.2% of families were below the poverty line. 2.2% of those under the age of 18 and 2.7% of those over 64 were below the poverty line.

Climate
Moss Beach has a Mediterranean climate (Köppen Csb) typical of the West Coast that is characterized by mild, rainy winters and cool, mild to warm summers, with an average temperature of 55°F (13 °C).

The area experiences some warmer degrees than Half Moon Bay due its proximity to San Francisco and coastal influence fog all year round and an Indian summer.

There is no significant snow occurring in Moss Beach in winter months. Though snowfall along the coast in Moss Beach has never been measurable, however, snow flurries were observed in December 1972 and 1976.

Typical of Northern California, most of the rain falls from November to April. There is often fog and overcast during the night and morning hours, usually clearing to offshore during the afternoon. Persistent sea breezes help to moderate the climate along the coast.

Politics

Locally, Moss Beach and other portions of the unincorporated Midcoast is represented by the elected Midcoast Community Council.

Noteworthy features
Because of the air currents off the Pacific Ocean, Moss Beach experiences above average fog levels, but also high quality ambient air. Situated along the coast of Moss Beach is the Fitzgerald Marine Reserve, a California designated area of Special Biological Significance. The reserve has a scenic blufftop trail through cypress groves overlooking the Pacific Ocean, historically significant tidepools, and a variety of marine animals and pelagic birds. The outcroppings along the beach are part of the Franciscan Complex.

Montara State Marine Reserve & Pillar Point State Marine Conservation Area extend offshore from Moss Beach. Like underwater parks, these protected areas help conserve ocean wildlife and marine ecosystems.

An occurrence of the rare plant Hickman's potentilla, Potentilla hickmanii, was observed by E.C. Suttliffe in 1933 in the vicinity of the mouth of San Vicente Creek within Moss Beach. This colony was not further documented for decades, but another colony was discovered toward the end of the 20th century north of Moss Beach. The plant was listed as California endangered in 1973 and as an endangered species by the United States government in 1998.

Off State Route 1 is Moss Beach Distillery, a restaurant that has its roots in bootleg liquor during Prohibition. The building is a California Point of Historical Interest. The restaurant, which claims to be haunted, was featured on the television series Ghost Hunters, where they revealed that owners of the distillery have created hoaxes simulating paranormal activity.

Transportation
Primary road access is via State Route 1 (the Cabrillo Highway) from the north and south.

SamTrans route 117 provides service to Moss Beach with service from Linda Mar in Pacifica to Half Moon Bay.

References

External links

 Coastsider, Coastal San Mateo County news site
 Moss Beach Distillery homepage
 Fitzgerald Marine Reserve

Populated coastal places in California
Census-designated places in San Mateo County, California
Census-designated places in California